Jalan Simpang Ampat (Melaka state route M10) is a major road in Malacca, Malaysia. It is also a main route to A' Famosa Resort.

List of junctions

Roads in Malacca